Henry Artur Palmé (4 September 1907 – 2 June 1987) was a Swedish marathon runner. He finished 13th at the 1936 Summer Olympics and won a bronze medal at the 1938 European Athletics Championships.

Palmé held national titles in the marathon (1934 to 1944) and 8 km cross country (1934 and 1941). He won the Sporting Life's marathon in London in 1938 and 1939.

References

1907 births
1987 deaths
Swedish male long-distance runners
Olympic athletes of Sweden
Athletes (track and field) at the 1936 Summer Olympics
European Athletics Championships medalists